Ricardo Moreno Escamilla (February 7, 1937 - June 25, 2008) was a Mexican professional boxer in the Super Featherweight division. Moreno was ranked #76 on The Ring's list of 100 All time Greatest Punchers.

Early life
Moreno was born and raised in the mining town of Chalchihuites, Zacatecas, Mexico. He left school to work as a metal breaker at the mines. Later he went to Mexico City where he worked as a parking lot attendant before turning to boxing. He did not fight as an amateur and turned professional at age 17 on June 16, 1954.

Professional career
Known as "Pajarito", Moreno was a heavy puncher, having won 19 of his first 20 fights with all 19 of his wins by KO.

World Featherweight Title
His only shot at a World Championship was on April 1, 1958, Moreno fought the champion Hogan Bassey in Wrigley Field, Los Angeles, California. Ricardo would lose this fight and it would also be Moreno's only shot at a world title due in large part to boxing politics.

After suffering two consecutive defeats in 1967, the 30-year-old Moreno retired. His only victory that wasn't a knockout was a disqualification victory.

Due to his incredible knockout power, Moreno was named to the Ring Magazine's list of 100 Greatest Punchers.

Professional record

|- style="margin:0.5em auto; font-size:95%;"
| style="text-align:center;" colspan="8"|60 Wins (59 knockouts, 0 decisions, 1 disqualification), 12 Losses (8 knockouts, 4 decisions), 1 Draw
|-  style="text-align:center; margin:0.5em auto; font-size:95%; background:#e3e3e3;"
|  style="border-style:none none solid solid; "|Res.
|  style="border-style:none none solid solid; "|Record
|  style="border-style:none none solid solid; "|Opponent
|  style="border-style:none none solid solid; "|Type
|  style="border-style:none none solid solid; "|Rd., Time
|  style="border-style:none none solid solid; "|Date
|  style="border-style:none none solid solid; "|Location
|  style="border-style:none none solid solid; "|Notes
|- align=center
|Loss
|60-12-1
|style="text-align:left;"| Silverio Ortiz
|
|
|
|style="text-align:left;"| 
|style="text-align:left;"|
|- align=center
|Loss
|60-11-1
|style="text-align:left;"| Alex Benitez
|
|
|
|style="text-align:left;"| 
|style="text-align:left;"|
|- align=center
|Win
|60-10-1
|style="text-align:left;"| Joey Aguilar
|
|
|
|style="text-align:left;"| 
|style="text-align:left;"|
|- align=center
|Loss
|59-10-1
|style="text-align:left;"| Raul Rojas
|
|
|
|style="text-align:left;"| 
|style="text-align:left;"|
|- align=center
|Loss
|59-9-1
|style="text-align:left;"| Raul Rojas
|
|
|
|style="text-align:left;"| 
|style="text-align:left;"|
|- align=center
|Win
|59-8-1
|style="text-align:left;"| Victor Robles
|
|
|
|style="text-align:left;"| 
|style="text-align:left;"|
|- align=center
|Win
|58-8-1
|style="text-align:left;"| Tony Vazquez
|
|
|
|style="text-align:left;"| 
|style="text-align:left;"|
|- align=center
|Win
|57-8-1
|style="text-align:left;"| Fernando Goncalves
|
|
|
|style="text-align:left;"| 
|style="text-align:left;"|
|- align=center
|Win
|56-8-1
|style="text-align:left;"| Beto Maldonado
|
|
|
|style="text-align:left;"| 
|style="text-align:left;"|
|- align=center
|Win
|55-8-1
|style="text-align:left;"| Danny Kid
|
|
|
|style="text-align:left;"| 
|style="text-align:left;"|
|- align=center
|Win
|54-8-1
|style="text-align:left;"| Trino Savala
|
|
|
|style="text-align:left;"| 
|style="text-align:left;"|
|- align=center
|Win
|53-8-1
|style="text-align:left;"| Manuel Ochoa
|
|
|
|style="text-align:left;"| 
|style="text-align:left;"|
|- align=center
|Win
|52-8-1
|style="text-align:left;"| Luis Echevesta
|
|
|
|style="text-align:left;"| 
|style="text-align:left;"|
|- align=center
|Win
|51-8-1
|style="text-align:left;"| Benny Burton
|
|
|
|style="text-align:left;"| 
|style="text-align:left;"|
|- align=center
|Win
|50-8-1
|style="text-align:left;"| Babby Lopez
|
|
|
|style="text-align:left;"| 
|style="text-align:left;"|
|- align=center
|Win
|49-8-1
|style="text-align:left;"| Mexico Solis
|
|
|
|style="text-align:left;"| 
|style="text-align:left;"|
|- align=center
|Win
|48-8-1
|style="text-align:left;"| Ventarron Lara
|
|
|
|style="text-align:left;"| 
|style="text-align:left;"|
|- align=center
|Win
|47-8-1
|style="text-align:left;"| Silverio Ortiz
|
|
|
|style="text-align:left;"| 
|style="text-align:left;"|
|- align=center
|Win
|46-8-1
|style="text-align:left;"| Jose Miguel Moreno
|
|
|
|style="text-align:left;"| 
|style="text-align:left;"|
|- align=center
|Win
|45-8-1
|style="text-align:left;"| Ray Antunez
|
|
|
|style="text-align:left;"| 
|style="text-align:left;"|
|- align=center
|Win
|44-8-1
|style="text-align:left;"| Salve Ortiz
|
|
|
|style="text-align:left;"| 
|style="text-align:left;"|
|- align=center
|Win
|43-8-1
|style="text-align:left;"| Lobito Cortez
|
|
|
|style="text-align:left;"| 
|style="text-align:left;"|
|- align=center
|Win
|42-8-1
|style="text-align:left;"| Maurillio Kid
|
|
|
|style="text-align:left;"| 
|style="text-align:left;"|
|- align=center
|Win
|41-8-1
|style="text-align:left;"| Tiger Soliz
|
|
|
|style="text-align:left;"| 
|style="text-align:left;"|
|- align=center
|Win
|40-8-1
|style="text-align:left;"| Cruz Figueroa
|
|
|
|style="text-align:left;"| 
|style="text-align:left;"|
|- align=center
|Win
|39-8-1
|style="text-align:left;"| Panchito Ortiz
|
|
|
|style="text-align:left;"| 
|style="text-align:left;"|
|- align=center
|Win
|38-8-1
|style="text-align:left;"| Teddy Rand
|
|
|
|style="text-align:left;"| 
|style="text-align:left;"|
|- align=center
|Loss
|37-8-1
|style="text-align:left;"| Claudio Adame
|
|
|
|style="text-align:left;"| 
|style="text-align:left;"|
|- align=center
|Win
|37-7-1
|style="text-align:left;"| Panchito Villa II
|
|
|
|style="text-align:left;"| 
|style="text-align:left;"|
|- align=center
|Win
|36-7-1
|style="text-align:left;"| Hector Garcia
|
|
|
|style="text-align:left;"| 
|style="text-align:left;"|
|- align=center
|Loss
|35-7-1
|style="text-align:left;"| Kid Irapuato
|
|
|
|style="text-align:left;"| 
|style="text-align:left;"|
|- align=center
|Loss
|35-6-1
|style="text-align:left;"| Kid Anahuac
|
|
|
|style="text-align:left;"| 
|style="text-align:left;"|
|- align=center
|Win
|35-5-1
|style="text-align:left;"| Luis Sanchez
|
|
|
|style="text-align:left;"| 
|style="text-align:left;"|
|- align=center
|Win
|34-5-1
|style="text-align:left;"| Hector Garcia
|
|
|
|style="text-align:left;"| 
|style="text-align:left;"|
|- align=center
|Win
|33-5-1
|style="text-align:left;"| Pat McCoy
|
|
|
|style="text-align:left;"| 
|style="text-align:left;"|
|- align=center
|Win
|32-5-1
|style="text-align:left;"| Al Wilcher
|
|
|
|style="text-align:left;"| 
|style="text-align:left;"|
|- align=center
|Loss
|31-5-1
|style="text-align:left;"| Davey Moore
|
|
|
|style="text-align:left;"| 
|style="text-align:left;"|
|- align=center
|Win
|31-4-1
|style="text-align:left;"| Frankie Salas
|
|
|
|style="text-align:left;"| 
|style="text-align:left;"|
|- align=center
|Win
|30-4-1
|style="text-align:left;"| Rocky Fontanette
|
|
|
|style="text-align:left;"| 
|style="text-align:left;"|
|- align=center
|Loss
|29-4-1
|style="text-align:left;"| Hogan Kid Bassey
|
|
|
|style="text-align:left;"| 
|style="text-align:left;"|
|- align=center
|Win
|29-3-1
|style="text-align:left;"| Ike Chestnut
|
|
|
|style="text-align:left;"| 
|style="text-align:left;"|
|- align=center
|Loss
|28-3-1
|style="text-align:left;"| Jose Luis Cotero
|
|
|
|style="text-align:left;"| 
|style="text-align:left;"|
|- align=center
|Win
|28-2-1
|style="text-align:left;"| Gaetano Annaloro
|
|
|
|style="text-align:left;"| 
|style="text-align:left;"|
|- align=center
|Win
|27-2-1
|style="text-align:left;"| Tommy Bain
|
|
|
|style="text-align:left;"| 
|style="text-align:left;"|
|- align=center
|Win
|26-2-1
|style="text-align:left;"| Jesse Mongia
|
|
|
|style="text-align:left;"| 
|style="text-align:left;"|
|- align=center
|Win
|25-2-1
|style="text-align:left;"| Sherman Liggins
|
|
|
|style="text-align:left;"| 
|style="text-align:left;"|
|- align=center
|Win
|24-2-1
|style="text-align:left;"| Billy Evans
|
|
|
|style="text-align:left;"| 
|style="text-align:left;"|
|- align=center
|Win
|23-2-1
|style="text-align:left;"| Pappy Gault
|
|
|
|style="text-align:left;"| 
|style="text-align:left;"|
|- align=center
|Win
|22-2-1
|style="text-align:left;"| Frankie Campos
|
|
|
|style="text-align:left;"| 
|style="text-align:left;"|
|- align=center
|Win
|21-2-1
|style="text-align:left;"| Oscar Suarez
|
|
|
|style="text-align:left;"| 
|style="text-align:left;"|
|- align=center
|Win
|20-2-1
|style="text-align:left;"| Alejo Mejia
|
|
|
|style="text-align:left;"| 
|style="text-align:left;"|
|- align=center
|Draw
|19-2-1
|style="text-align:left;"| Kildo Martinez
|
|
|
|style="text-align:left;"| 
|style="text-align:left;"|
|- align=center
|Loss
|19-2
|style="text-align:left;"| Memo Diez
|
|
|
|style="text-align:left;"| 
|style="text-align:left;"|
|- align=center
|Win
|19-1
|style="text-align:left;"| Jorge Gabino Gomez
|
|
|
|style="text-align:left;"| 
|style="text-align:left;"|
|- align=center
|Win
|18-1
|style="text-align:left;"| Mario Macias
|
|
|
|style="text-align:left;"| 
|style="text-align:left;"|
|- align=center
|Win
|17-1
|style="text-align:left;"| Pedro Garcia
|
|
|
|style="text-align:left;"| 
|style="text-align:left;"|
|- align=center
|Win
|16-1
|style="text-align:left;"| Americo Rivera
|
|
|
|style="text-align:left;"| 
|style="text-align:left;"|
|- align=center
|Win
|15-1
|style="text-align:left;"| Aurelio Rivera
|
|
|
|style="text-align:left;"| 
|style="text-align:left;"|
|- align=center
|Win
|14-1
|style="text-align:left;"| Mike Cruz
|
|
|
|style="text-align:left;"| 
|style="text-align:left;"|
|- align=center
|Win
|13-1
|style="text-align:left;"| Fifi Torres
|
|
|
|style="text-align:left;"| 
|style="text-align:left;"|
|- align=center
|Win
|12-1
|style="text-align:left;"| Danny Bedolla
|
|
|
|style="text-align:left;"| 
|style="text-align:left;"|
|- align=center
|Win
|11-1
|style="text-align:left;"| Jorge Gabino Gomez
|
|
|
|style="text-align:left;"| 
|style="text-align:left;"|
|- align=center
|Win
|10-1
|style="text-align:left;"| Cheto Fernandez
|
|
|
|style="text-align:left;"| 
|style="text-align:left;"|
|- align=center
|Win
|9-1
|style="text-align:left;"| Pepe Chavarria
|
|
|
|style="text-align:left;"| 
|style="text-align:left;"|
|- align=center
|Win
|8-1
|style="text-align:left;"| Babe Gomez
|
|
|
|style="text-align:left;"| 
|style="text-align:left;"|
|- align=center
|Win
|7-1
|style="text-align:left;"| Jorge Herrera
|
|
|
|style="text-align:left;"| 
|style="text-align:left;"|
|- align=center
|Win
|6-1
|style="text-align:left;"| Fernando Garcia
|
|
|
|style="text-align:left;"| 
|style="text-align:left;"|
|- align=center
|Win
|5-1
|style="text-align:left;"| Chato Monroy
|
|
|
|style="text-align:left;"| 
|style="text-align:left;"|
|- align=center
|Loss
|4-1
|style="text-align:left;"| Nacho Escalante
|
|
|
|style="text-align:left;"| 
|style="text-align:left;"|
|- align=center
|Win
|4-0
|style="text-align:left;"| Antonio Coria
|
|
|
|style="text-align:left;"| 
|style="text-align:left;"|
|- align=center
|Win
|3-0
|style="text-align:left;"| Sergio Farias
|
|
|
|style="text-align:left;"| 
|style="text-align:left;"|
|- align=center
|Win
|2-0
|style="text-align:left;"| Juancito Lopez
|
|
|
|style="text-align:left;"| 
|style="text-align:left;"|
|- align=center
|Win
|1-0
|style="text-align:left;"| Oscar Diaz
|
|
|
|style="text-align:left;"| 
|style="text-align:left;"|
|}

Life after boxing
Moreno starred in two films, he even had a relationship with Miss Universe contestant and actress Ana Bertha Lepe.

Mexico still to this day mourns the life of the great Ricardo "Pajarito" Moreno, who as young boxer was turned on to cocaine by the jet set of Mexico. He died a depressed man at the age of 71 at a Rehabilitation Center in Durango.

He is buried in his home town of Chalchihuites in El Panteón Dolores.

References

External links

Boxers from Zacatecas
People from Zacatecas City
Super-featherweight boxers
1937 births
2008 deaths
Mexican male boxers